Barouéli is a town and commune and seat of the Cercle of Barouéli in the Ségou Region of southern-central Mali. In 1998 the commune had a population of 32,739.

Situation
Barouéli is directly south of Ségou Cercle, and directly north of Koulikoro Cercle.

The Commune of Barouéli is composed of the town of Barouéli and forty surrounding villages, with an estimated population of 47000 in 2001 (15000 in Barouéli town proper).

The Cercle of Barouéli contains the Communes of Barouéli, Boidié, Dougoufié, Guendo, Kalaké, Konobougou, N’Gassola, Sanando, Somo, Tamani and Tesserla.

Culture
Once located in the center of the Bambara Empire, the area's population is overwhelmingly Bambara.

The town's football club AS Bakaridjan de Barouéli, plays in the top level Malien Premiere Division.

Environmental resources
It contains the forests of Barouéli, Tamani, and Boidié, which have come under pressure from overexploitation.

Sister city
Vannes, France

References

Portions of this article were translated from the French language Wikipedia article Barouéli.

External links
 Malaria transmission studies in the rural towns of Kemena and Sougoula, Barouéli.  University of Mali, Bamako and the United States Laboratory of Malaria and Vector Research at the National Institute of Allergy and Infectious Disease (NIAID),

Communes of Ségou Region